Born for You is a Philippine musical drama television series directed by Jonathan Diaz and Jon Villarin, starring Janella Salvador and Elmo Magalona. The series premiered on ABS-CBN's Primetime Bida evening block and worldwide on The Filipino Channel on June 20, 2016, replacing The Story of Us.

Born for You ended on September 16, 2016, ending its 3-month run with 65 episodes.

List of episodes

References

Lists of Philippine drama television series episodes